Sohail Asghar (15 June 1954 – 13 November 2021) was a Pakistani TV, Film and Theater actor.

Life
Sohail was born in Lahore, Pakistan. After completing his education he joined Radio Pakistan. He worked as Radio Jockey from 1978 to 1988. He was introduced in TV drama Raat by a Director at PTV Lahore Nusrat Thakur. He appeared in his first movie named Murad in 2003. He got award for Outstanding Performance at The 1st Indus Drama Awards for this film.

He got best actor award for the year 2002 at 12th PTV Awards show organized to mark 40 years of Pakistan Television.

Asghar died on 13 November 2021, in a hospital in Lahore.

Filmography

 Murad (2003)
 Mahnoor (2004)
 Victim of an honor killing

Dramas

 Khafa Khafa Zindagi (2018)
 Teri Meri Love Story (2016)
 Aap ki Kaneez (2014)
 Aashti (2009)
 Laag as Kaku Lala (1998)
 Khwahish as Ruliya Piyas Chand Grehan Alao (1994)
 Kajal Ghar Khuda Ki Basti'' (Geo TV Production)

Accolades

References

External links
 

1954 births
2021 deaths
Pakistani male film actors
21st-century Pakistani male actors
Male actors from Lahore
PTV Award winners